The 2003 Coca-Cola GM was the 33rd edition of the Greenlandic Men's Football Championship. The final round was held in Qaqortoq, Greenland. It was won by Kissaviarsuk-33 for the eighth time in its history.

Qualifying stage

North Greenland

Playoff

FC Malamuk qualified for the final Round.

Disko Bay

Central Greenland

East Greenland

South Greenland

Final round

Pool 1

Pool 2

Playoffs

Semi-finals

Seventh-place match

Fifth-place match

Third-place match

Final

See also
Football in Greenland
Football Association of Greenland
Greenland national football team
Greenlandic Men's Football Championship

References

Greenlandic Men's Football Championship seasons
Green
Green
Foot